Tales of the Vampires is a five issue American comic book limited series (later collected in a single trade paperback), published by Dark Horse Comics and set in the Buffyverse. It comprises an anthology of short stories written by Joss Whedon, Jane Espenson, Ben Edlund, and Drew Goddard. Each story tells the tale of one or more Buffyverse vampires, and the otherwise unrelated collection is strung together by a bridging story written by Whedon.

The anthology is presented as a series of stories told by an ancient vampire to a group of young Watchers. Tales of the Vampires is the tale of that storytelling session and functions as a bridge among the other items in the anthology. The stories in this series are generally considered to be an official part of the Buffyverse canon.

Dark Horse published a new one-shot special based on the Tales of the Vampires concept by Becky Cloonan, Vasilis Lolos, Gabriel Bá and Fabio Moon in June 2009. Specifically, this one-shot is a tie-in with the Buffy the Vampire Slayer Season Eight storyline following "Harmonic Divergence" in which vampires become very popular with the public at large.

Issues

Drawing on Your Nightmares
Halloween one-shot special (September 10, 2003)

Issue #1
Published (December 10, 2003) cover by John Totleben

Issue #2
Published (January 14, 2004) cover by Ben Templesmith

Issue #3
Published (February 11, 2004) cover by Eric Powell

Issue #4
Published (March 17, 2004) cover by Ben Edlund

Issue #5
Published (April 28, 2004) cover by Ben Edlund

See also
Tales of the Slayers graphic novel
Tales of the Slayers: Broken Bottle of Djinn one-shot comic book

References

Buffyverse
Buffyverse comic book crossovers
Comics based on Buffy the Vampire Slayer
Comics by Joss Whedon
Fantasy comics
Horror comics